All the Rivers Run is an Australian historical novel by Nancy Cato, first published in 1958.

It was adapted as a 1983 Australian television mini-series starring Sigrid Thornton and John Waters. The mini-series is marketed with the tagline A sweeping saga of one woman's struggle for survival.  A sequel, All the Rivers Run II, was produced in 1989.

Story 

All the Rivers Run follows the life of English girl, Philadelphia Gordon, from the time when she is shipwrecked and orphaned off the coast of Victoria in 1890. She spends most of her life around Echuca, on the Murray River, and invests some of her inheritance in the paddle steamer called PS Philadelphia. Her life is changed forever when she meets paddle steamer captain Brenton Edwards. She is torn between the harsh beauty of life on the river with its adventures, and the society life in Melbourne with her blossoming career as a painter. It is an adventure and a love story: between her, the men in her life, and the river.

Miniseries

Main cast 

 Sigrid Thornton – Philadelphia Gordon
 John Waters – Brenton Edwards
 Charles Tingwell – Uncle Charles
 Nicholas Brown – Gordon
 Dinah Shearing – Aunt Hester
 Adrian Wright – Alistair Raeburn
 Diane Craig – Miss Barrett
 Gus Mercurio – Tom Gritchley
 John Alansu – Ah Lee
 William Upjohn – Adam
 Frank Gallacher – Mac
 Constance Landsberg – Bessie Griggs
 Darius Perkins – Ben
 Caroline Gillmer – Mabel Blackeney
 Kirk Alexander – Jim
 Celia de Burgh – Imogen
 Chantal Contouri – Julia
 Nick Waters – Mr. Slope
 Carol Burns – Mrs. Slope
 Vivean Gray – Alicia Raeburn
 Betty Lucas – Janet Raeburn

Production

Both mini-series were shot on location in Echuca, as well as locations in Melbourne.

The paddle steamer PS Pevensey was filmed as the PS Philadelphia. Today, visitors to Echuca can take short trips on it.

Release

Versions

The first series comprises four two-hour episodes first broadcast in October 1983, the second series comprises two two-hour episodes first broadcast on 18 March 1990. In the US, the mini-series was shown on the premium channel, HBO, premiering on 15 January 1984.<ref name="HBO program guide: January 1984">HBO program guide: January 1984</ref>All the Rivers Run: The Definitive Collection DVDs contains both mini-series, as Parts I and II. The Part 1, All the Rivers Run I, is on 3 DVDs, with 8 episodes of approximately 48 minutes each (even though they are advertised as one-hour episodes). Disc 1 contains episode 1 (51 minutes 28 seconds) and episode 2 (45:58). Disc 2 contains episode 3 (46:25), episode 4 (47:37) and episode 5 (48:57). Disc 3 contains episode 6 (50:14), episode 7 (48:01), episode 8 (48:30), a three-minute interview with John Waters, an eight-minute interview with Sigrid Thornton and a trailer/promotion for the mini-series. The Part 2, All the Rivers Run II, is on 2 DVDs. The first disc contains episode 1 (1 hour 36 minutes 34 seconds) and the second disc contains episode 2 (1:37:47). It also includes an audio CD with the soundtrack from the mini-series.

Reception

The series was a massive ratings success in Australia and was sold to over 70 countries, including the US, where it was screened by HBO premiering on 15 January 1984 on the network. and in USSR where it ran in 1988.

All the Rivers Run II

The sequel follows on with the same main characters, but with actress Nikki Coghill replacing Sigrid Thornton in the leading role. New characters include Cyrus P. James, a handsome American, and Arthur Blackwell (Tim Robertson), a rich villain who wants to buy out the PS Philadelphia''.

Main cast 

 John Waters – Brenton Edwards
 Nikki Coghill – Philadelphia Gordon
 Parker Stevenson – Cyrus
 Charles Tingwell – Uncle Charles
 John Jacobs – Sid
 John Alansu – Ah Lee
 Sudi de Winter – Gordon
 Tim Robertson – Blackwell
 Alan Fletcher – McLean
 Kahlie Sneddon – Meg
 Eric McKibbin – Brenny
 Gil Tucker – Hopkins
 Jon Concannon – Bates
 Michele Fawdon – Ruth
 David Cameron – Enright
 Peta Toppano – Eunice Pyke

References

External links 
 Source of novel title
 
All the Rivers Run at Australian Screen Online

1983 films
Australian drama television series
1980s Australian television miniseries
Films based on Australian novels
Films based on romance novels
Television shows set in Victoria (Australia)
1983 Australian television series debuts
HBO original programming
Murray River
Television shows set in colonial Australia
English-language television shows
1983 Australian television series endings
1958 Australian novels